Pathogen is the second studio album by Polish melodic death metal band Made of Hate. It was released on August 27, 2010, by AFM Records.

Track listing

Credits

References

2010 albums